Major Rafiqul Islam  is a Bangladesh Awami League politician and the incumbent Jatiya Sangsad member from Chandpur-5 constituency.

Early life and career
Rafiqul Islam, was born on September 13, 1943 in the Naora village, located in the Shahrasti municipality of the Chandpur district. He is a Bangladeshi national, brave freedom fighter, writer and popular politician. He 
was awarded the Bir Uttam (B.U), the highest gallantry award for bravery in battlefield 
during the Liberation War in 1971. 
He was Sector Commander of Number 1 Sector of Bangladesh Liberation War in 
1971. Number 1 sector included all areas east of the Muhuri river in Feni 
district, Khagrachari district, Rangamati district, Bandarban district,
Chittagong district and Cox’s Bazar district, extending up to the western border of Myanmar. 
After leaving the army at the end of the Liberation War, he served for over 14 years as the Chairman of the following  
government organizations: Dhaka Water and Sewerage Authority, Bangladesh Handloom Board, and Bangladesh Inland Water Transport Corporation. 
Afterwards, he was nominated and included in the 1st Caretaker Government of 
Bangladesh as Advisor during 1990-1991, and was given the responsibility of the Ministry of Shipping and the Ministry of 
Civil Aviation and Tourism. Thereafter, he joined the Bangladesh Awami League and ran for political office. He was elected 
a member of Bangladesh Parliament in July, 1996 from 264-Chandpur-5 (Hajigonj-Shahrasti Upazillas)

He was re-elected to the parliament in 2008, 2014 and 2018 from Chandpur-5 constituency as a Bangladesh Awami League candidate.

References

External links

Living people
1943 births
Awami League politicians
Bangladesh Army officers
Recipients of the Bir Uttom
7th Jatiya Sangsad members
9th Jatiya Sangsad members
10th Jatiya Sangsad members
11th Jatiya Sangsad members
Place of birth missing (living people)
Mukti Bahini personnel